Mont-Tremblant public transit is a small scale public transit system that services the resort town of Mont Tremblant in the Laurentian Mountains of Quebec, Canada, approximately  north of Montreal. Service requirements depend on the season and the routes and frequency of service will vary accordingly.

Other operations in Mont Tremblant include:
 Mont Tremblant Resort Shuttle - operates June to September for 7 days a week
 Parking shuttle - free service
 Mont-Tremblant National Park Shuttle

References

External links
 Public Transit of the Ville de Mont-Tremblant

Mont-Tremblant, Quebec
Transport in Laurentides